Enrique Manuel Hernández Rivera (born August 12, 1938) is a Puerto Rican born American prelate of the Roman Catholic Church.  He served as bishop of the Diocese of Caguas in Puerto Rico from 1981 to 1998.  He previously serve as an auxiliary bishop of the Archdiocese of San Juan in Puerto Rico from 1979 to 1981.

Biography 
Enrique Hernández was born in Camuy, Puerto Rico, on August 12, 1938.  He was ordained to the priesthood for the Diocese of Areceibo on June 8, 1968.  

On June 11, 1979, Pope John Paul II named Hernández as an auxiliary bishop of the  Archdiocese of San Juan.  He was consecrated on August 17, 1979, by Cardinal Luis Aponte Martínez at the Roberto Clemente Stadium in San Juan, Puerto Rico.  John Paul II named Hernández as bishop of the Diocese of Caguas on February 13, 198.

Hernández's resignation as bishop of Caguas was accepted on July 28, 1998 by John Paul II.

See also
 

 Catholic Church hierarchy
 Catholic Church in the United States
 Historical list of the Catholic bishops of Puerto Rico
 Historical list of the Catholic bishops of the United States
 List of Catholic bishops of the United States
 Lists of patriarchs, archbishops, and bishops

References

External links
 Roman Catholic Diocese of Caguas (Official Site in Spanish)

Episcopal succession

1938 births
Living people
Bishops appointed by Pope John Paul II
People from Camuy, Puerto Rico
Puerto Rican Roman Catholic bishops
Place of birth missing (living people)
Roman Catholic bishops of Puerto Rico
Roman Catholic bishops of Caguas